The Chugaev elimination is a chemical reaction that involves the elimination of water from alcohols to produce alkenes. The intermediate is a xanthate. It is named for its discoverer, the Russian chemist Lev Aleksandrovich Chugaev (1873-1922), who first reported the reaction sequence in 1899.

In the first step, a xanthate salt is formed out of the alkoxide and carbon disulfide (CS2). With the addition of iodomethane, the alkoxide is transformed into a methyl xanthate.

At about 200 °C, the alkene is formed by an intramolecular elimination. In a 6-membered cyclic transition state the hydrogen atom is removed from the carbon atom β to the xanthate oxygen in a syn-elimination. The side product decomposes to carbonyl sulfide (OCS) and methanethiol.

The Chugaev elimination is similar in mechanism to other thermal elimination reactions such as the Cope elimination and ester pyrolysis. Xanthates typically undergo elimination from 120 to 200 °C, while esters typically require 400 to 500 °C and amine oxides routinely react between 80 and 160 °C.

See also
 Barton–McCombie deoxygenation

References

External links 
 Animation of the mechanism of the Chugaev elimination

Elimination reactions
Olefination reactions
Name reactions